Lake Arthur may refer to:

Canada
 Lake Arthur (Quebec), a lake in the Côte-Nord administrative region, Quebec.

New Zealand
 Lake Arthur (West Coast), a lake in the West Coast region, South Island
 Lake Rotoroa (Tasman), formerly known as Lake Arthur

United States
 Lake Arthur, Louisiana, a town in Jefferson Davis Parish
 Lake Arthur (Minnesota), a lake in Polk County
 Lake Arthur, New Mexico, a town in Chaves County
 Lake Arthur, Pennsylvania, a lake in Butler County
 Lake Arthur (Washington), a lake in Spokane, next to Gonzaga University
 , a ship in the United States Navy named after the Louisiana town

See also
Arthurs Lake (Tasmania), a lake in Australia